Nanmeng may refer to the following towns in Hebei province, China:

 Nanmeng, Shijiazhuang, subdivision of Gaocheng District
 Nanmeng, Bazhou, Hebei (zh), subdivision of Bazhou, Hebei